Carita de ángel (English title: Little Angel Face) is a Mexican children's telenovela produced by Nicandro Díaz González for Televisa in 2000. It is a remake of the telenovela Papa Corazon, which also was adapted for Mundo de juguete. Libertad Lamarque died during the filming of this telenovela and was replaced by Silvia Pinal.

Lisette Morelos and Miguel de León starred as protagonists, Daniela Aedo starred as child protagonist, while Mariana Ávila, Roberto Palazuelos, Ana Patricia Rojo, and the leading actress Ana Luisa Peluffo starred as antagonists; also featured a performance by actress Libertad Lamarque.

History 
On 19 June 2000, Canal de las Estrellas started broadcasting Carita de Ángel weekdays at 4:00pm, replacing Amigos x siempre. The last episode was broadcast on 16 March 2001 with Rayito de luz replacing it the following day. From 11 December 2000 until 5 January 2001, the soap opera interrupted its broadcast in order to go to Christmas minitelenovela Rayito de luz. Univision aired Caríta de ángel on March 5, 2001 - November 15, 2001 weeknights at 7pm/6c replacing Locura de amor.The last episode was broadcast on Thursday November 15, 2001 with La intrusa replacing it Monday November 19, 2001. In Indonesia, this telenovela was broadcast on RCTI in early 2003, and a year later, in 2004, it was broadcast on SCTV. In the United States, it was re-aired on the Spanish channel UniMás (formerly known as Telefutura) from 14 June 2012 to 28 February 2013, and aired again on UniMás weekdays at 8am/7c from 1 February 2021 to 1 October 2021, replacing a recording of the previous weeknight's episode of Pájaro Soñador.

Plot 
Dulce Maria is a sweet, 5-year-old girl full of joy, compassion, and good feelings. After the death of her mother, Luciano Larios (Dulce Maria's father) sinks into depression and lives abroad for a few years, leaving his daughter and loved ones behind. Dulce Maria enrolls in a Catholic boarding school for girls called "Reina de America" (Queen of America) to be taken care of by the nuns, as well as being taken care of by her uncle Gabriel, who is a priest.

The only relative that visits her is her Aunt Estefania, whom she affectionately called "Tia Pelucas" (Auntie Wigs) because she wears a large and varied set of colorful wigs, instead of showing her real hair. The nuns, for the most part, worship and love Dulce María, in particular the Sisters Cecilia and Fortunata, who are her accomplices in all her funny antics that are also allowed by the tender and kindly Mother Superior, the headmistress, who is always aware of the responsibility and discipline that must be met; while showing concern and great heart for the welfare of all those around her.

Dulce Maria also has a secret place in the school known as "The old little room." There, her playful imagination comes to life, where she speaks with her mother Angelica, who dispenses advice to her and tells her wonderful stories. Things brighten up for Dulce Maria when after a two-year absence, Luciano announces his return to Mexico. But the initial joy fades when her dad arrives with Nicole, a domineering and self-centered woman who is also Luciano's fiancée. Her only reason for being with Luciano is for his money and she sees Dulce Maria as a mere nuisance.

Her plan is to get Luciano's daughter out of her way so she can have him all to herself. Sensing that her father will not be happy being married to Nicole, and not wanting to lose her father's affection, Dulce Maria sets out to end the relationship and make her father notice Sister Cecilia, who is more of a mother figure than Nicole.

Luciano slowly realizes that he does not love Nicole, while at the same time, feels a growing attraction to Cecilia. She, in turn, realizes that her religious vocation begins to waver once she realizes that she is in love with Luciano and must decide whether to take her religious vows or give them up and listen to her heart.

Cast
Daniela Aedo as Dulce María Larios Valle
Lisette Morelos as Cecilia Santos de Larios/Sister Cecilia
Miguel de León as Luciano Larios Rocha
Libertad Lamarque as Mother Superior Piedad de la luz
Silvia Pinal as Reverend Lucía
Nora Salinas as Estefanía Larios de Gamboa "Aunt Wigs"
Marisol Santacruz as Angélica Valle de Larios
Manuel Saval as Father Gabriel Larios Rocha
Adriana Acosta as Sister Fortunata Rico
Juan Pablo Gamboa as Noé Gamboa
Polo Ortín as Silvestre Núñez
Ana Patricia Rojo as Nicole Romero Medrano
Mariana Ávila as Cassandra Gamboa Campos
Paty Díaz as Sister Clementina
Joaquín Cordero as Don Adolfo Valle
Ana Luisa Peluffo as Aída Medrano Vda. de Romero
Arena Ibarra as Lluvia Amezcua
Nancy Patiño as Alfonsina Núñez
Priscila Herrera as Bárbara Guerra
Andrea Soberón as Frida Iturbe
Mario Thadeo as Centavito
Iliana Montserrat as Juanita Pérez
Génesis Romo as Anita Pérez
Raúl Padilla "Chóforo" as Pascual Huerta
Verónica Macías as Verónica Medina Rico
Héctor Suárez Gomis as Omar Gasca
Mariagna Prats as Francesca Rossi
Estrella Lugo as Selene Gallardo
Marga López as Mother General Asunción de la Luz
Juan Carlos Serrán as Rómulo Rossi
Ingrid Martz as Doménica Rossi
José María Torre as Leonel
Carmen Amezcua as Clarissa Santos Dorantes de Valadez
Alejandro Ruiz as Homero Anaya Rubalcaba
Francisco Avendaño as Dr. Andrés Urquiza
Rosita Pelayo as Fedora Aldama
Roberto Palazuelos as Flavio Romero Medrano
Janet Ruiz as Águeda
Teo Tapia as Perpetuo Chacón
Natasha Dupeyrón as Mariana
Andrea Lagunes as Irma Valadez Santos
Ana Lobo as Chiripa (voice)
Karla Kegel as Shula
Paola Kegel as Sheila
Isaura Espinoza as Genoveva
Alejandro de la Madrid as Jordi
Alejandra Procuna as Morelba
Carlos Espejel as Solovino (voice)
Marisol Centeno as Sonia Gómez
Gabriela Platas as Soraya
Mauricio Aspe as Saturno
Norma Herrera as Paulina Valle
Servando Manzetti as Lic. Cristóbal Valadez
Kelchie Arizmendi as Lorena "Lore"
Alfonso Iturralde as Dr. Luis Fragoso
Roberto "Flaco" Guzmán as Filemón
Alejandro Tommasi as Jaime Alberto
Yolanda Ventura as Julieta
Mónica Dossetti as Lorena Campos
Rafael Rojas as Gaspar
Roberto Tello as Tranquilino
David Ostrosky as Dr. Velasco
Irma Lozano as Altagracia Lemus Vda. de Rivera
Alexis Ayala as Leonardo Larios
Juan Carlos Casasola as Jairo
Raquel Morell as Minerva Gamboa de Alvarado
Vanessa Guzmán as Gilda Esparza
Gabriel Soto as Rogelio Alvarado Gamboa
Aurora Molina as Canuta
César Castro as Regino
Jaime Garza as Rutilio
José Suárez as Raymundo
Julio Vega as Fidelio
Luis Couturier as Dr. Heredia
Cristine Aguinaga as Katty
Génesis Bages as Daniela (at Institute Estudillo)
Beatriz Sheridan as Mrs. Estudillo
Lupita Lara as Magdalena
Juan Soler as Marcos
Stephen Franco as Fausto
Kristoff as Zeno
Sergio Ramos as Agent Elizondo
Sara Luz as Nieves
Adalberto Martínez "Spring" as Hippolytus
Erika Buenfil as Policarpia "Poly" Zambrano
Arturo Peniche as Dr. Montemayor
Pedro Weber "Chatanuga" as Antonio
Rafael del Villar as Vladimir
Manola Diez as Carmina
Khotan as Alexis
Cecilia Gabriela as Victoria Torres de Montesinos
Ariel López Padilla as Adrian
Gustavo Rojo as Father Cosme
Oscar Morelli as Dr. Villanueva
Manuel "Flaco" Ibáñez as Candido
Marco Uriel as Gerardo Montesinos 
Humberto Elizondo as Solomon
Alejandro Aragón as Dionisio
Diana Osorio as Lupita
Eugenio Derbez as The Thousand Faces
Javier Herranz as Achilles
Isabel Martínez "La Stonechat" as Aunt Domitila
Renata Flores as Inspector Pantaleona Malacara
Jorge van Rankin as Thaddeus
Salim Rubiales as Ramiro
Socorro Bonilla as Donna Cruz
María Eugenia Ríos as Esperanza
Antonio de la Vega as Franco
Guillermo Rivas as Edgar
Maricarmen Vela as Silvina
César Bono as Toribio
Vilma Traca as Tonita
Susana Lozano as Elvira
Octavio Menduet as Colonel
Marlene Favela as Amber Ferrer
Jorge Arvizu "El Tata" as Anastasio
Katie Barberi as Noelia
Diego Barquinero as Clown Diegans
José Luis Cordero "Pocholo" as Facundo
Rebecca Mankita as Ivory de los Cobos
Sergio Miguel as Jimmy
Aline O'Farrill as Genoa
Héctor Parra as Mr. Iturbe
Oscar Traven as Ernesto Tirado
Sandra Itzel as Chabelita
Nora Velasquez as Ms. Malpica
Esperanza Rendón as Elba
Eugenia Avendaño as Mrs. Becerra
Dolores Solomon "Bodokito" as Mrs. Parker
Sonia Velestri as Carolina
Luis Xavier as Dr. Altamirano
Rafael Amador as Dr. Lake
Anabel Gutiérrez as Beggar
Eva Calvo as Gatinea
Beatriz Cecilia as Novice
Irma Torres as Homemade
Oscar Bonfiglio as Augustine
Alberto Angel "El Cuervo" as Fidel
Martin Rojas as Pancho
Litzy as Herself 
Baltazar Oviedo as Cleófas
Yurem Rojas as Edgar
Maki as Samantha
Emília Carranza as Sra. Zamora
Ivette Proal as Griselda
Archie Lafranco as Baldomero
Miguel Michel Anaya as Aberlardo

Notes

References

External links
 at esmas.com 

2000 telenovelas
Mexican telenovelas
2000 Mexican television series debuts
2001 Mexican television series endings
Television series about nuns
Television series about orphans
Television shows set in Mexico City
Televisa telenovelas
Children's telenovelas
Mexican television series based on Argentine television series
Spanish-language telenovelas